Kiti Karoliina Kokkonen (born 4 October 1974 in Helsinki, Finland) is a Finnish film and television actress, voice actress and writer. She is the daughter of film director Ere Kokkonen and actress Titta Jokinen.

Career 
Since then, Kokkonen has performed in the revues of Suomen Komediateatteri, among other places. She has acted in small supporting roles in the Vääpeli Körmy and Uuno Turhapuro  film series, and has made a number of voice acting roles. Kokkonen played her first lead role in the 2020 comedy film The Renovation, directed by Taneli Mustonen.

In 2018, Kokkonen starred in MTV3's sketch comedy television show Putous, where she played several small roles and her best-known  character. She won a playful sketch character contest with her Tanhupallo.

Selected filmography 
 Uuno in Spain (1985)
 Uuno Turhapuro Moves to the Country (1986)
 The Snow Queen (1986)
 Uuno Turhapuro – This Is My Life (2004)
 The Magic Crystal (2011)
 The Renovation (2020)

References

External links

1974 births
Living people
People from Helsinki
Finnish film actresses
Finnish voice actresses
Finnish television actresses
Finnish women writers